Benjamin Ola Akande is a Nigerian-American academic, professor, and business leader. In May 2021, he was named Senior Vice President, Director Human Resources, Head of Diversity and Inclusion, Stifel Financial, a wealth management and investment-banking firm founded in 1890 and based in St. Louis, Missouri with $4.7 billion annual revenue, $39 billion wealth management custodian, $36 billion asset management. He serves as a key advisor to Stifel on the execution of a companywide ESG strategy. He leads the talent organization with over 10,000 employees in over 400 global offices. Dr. Akande served as the ninth President of Champlain College in Burlington, Vermont and led the institution from April 2020 - May 2021. From April 2018 to April 2020 he served as Assistant Vice Chancellor of International Programs-Africa, Director of the Africa Initiative, and Associate Director of the Global Health Center at Washington University in St. Louis.  He is the former 21st president of Westminster College in Fulton, Missouri. Prior to Westminster, he served for 15 years as dean of the Webster University George Herbert Walker School of Business & Technology. Before that, at Wayland Baptist University, he was appointed Chief Academic Officer and Chair, Division of Business Administration. Throughout his career, he has consulted with Fortune 500 companies and private enterprise. He is recognized as a media spokesperson on topics such as leadership, economics, and entrepreneurship. He is a national speaker on topics related to leadership and economics.

Early life and education
Benjamin Ola Akande was born in Nigeria in 1962. His father, a renowned Baptist Minister, Rev. Dr. Samuel Ola. Akande and mother, Comfort Olalonpe, set high standards for him and his four sisters and encouraged them to aim high. He attended Comprehensive High School, Aiyetoro in Ogun State, Nigeria, graduating in 1978.
He moved to the United States to further his education in 1979 and earned a bachelor's degree in Business Administration at Wayland Baptist University. He proceeded to the University of Oklahoma where he completed master's degrees in Economics and Public Administration and a Ph.D. in Economics. He also completed post-doctoral courses at the John F. Kennedy School of Government at Harvard University and the Saïd School of Business at Oxford University.

Career
In 1995, Akande was appointed Chief Academic Officer and Chair, Division of Business Administration, at Wayland Baptist University. He also served as Special Assistant to the President.

In 2000, Akande was appointed as professor of economics and dean of the George Herbert Walker School of Business & Technology at Webster University, and Webster University's Chief of the Office of Corporate Partnerships where he was instrumental in developing and nurturing many corporate and donor partnerships.

From 2015 to 2017, he served as the first black president of Westminster College.

In April 2018 he became Assistant Vice Chancellor of International Programs-Africa, Director of the Africa Initiative, and Associate Director of the Global Health Center at Washington University in St. Louis.  Dr. Akande also chaired Washington University's International Travel Oversight Committee (ITOC).

From April 2020 to May 2021, Dr. Akande served as the 9th President of Champlain College in Burlington, Vermont.

In May 2021, he was named Senior Vice President, Director Human Resources, Head of Diversity and Inclusion, Stifel Financial in St. Louis, Missouri.

Akande has been a consultant to several multinational companies focusing on areas of corporate strategy and responsibility, leadership development and market positioning. He is also a well known commentator on economic and policy issues. He has appeared in NPR Marketplace Public Radio, Anderson Cooper 360 and CBS Evening News. He has been a consultant to the World Bank and the United Nations Development Program (UNDP).

Selected publications 
•   Akande, B., “Oreo Cookies, the Olympics, and Education,” University Business (October 2012).

•   Akande, B., Kourik, J., Maher, P., “Managing the Demands of Accreditation; The Impact of Global Business Schools,” Research in Higher Education Journal (Volume 14, October 2011).

•   Akande, B., Feltz, C., “HR’s New Year’s Resolution: Take a Seat at the Strategic Table,” Market Watch (January [1st Quarter/Winter] 6, 2011).

•   Maher, P., Kourik, J., Akande, B., “Achieving Quality, Excellence, and Consistency in a Global Academy,” Technology Management for Global Economic Growth, Portland International Center for Management of Engineering and Technology, PICMET Conference. July 18–22, 2010, Proceedings.

•   Akande, B., Feltz, C., “Why Strategy Fails?” Chief Learning Officer Magazine (August 2010).

•   Masidonski, P., Maher, P., Kourik, J., Akande, B., “Consistent Diversity: Balancing Cultural, Economic, and Assessment Needs in a Global Institution,” AACSB Annual Conference (June 2009).

•   Akande, B., “The Web-Savvy Generation,” Financial Times (April 5, 2009).

•   Bakewell, T., Akande, B., “Effective Nonprofit Governance: Lessons Learned,” National Association of Corporate Directors (July [3rd Quarter/Summer] 2008).

•   Akande, B., Developing Leadership Competencies, “Herausforderungen einer zukunftsorientierten Unternehmenspolitik: Okonomie, Umvelt, Technik and Gessellschaft als Determinanten,” July 2007, 3rd Quarter.

Recognitions and awards
·     Recognized as one of the 40 under 40 Distinguished Leaders in the Greater St. Louis Region, 2002

·     Webster University Presidential citation for contribution to institutional mission — Conception of the Energizer Global Staff exchange program, 2005

·     Most Influential St. Louisan, St. Louis Business Journal, 2007–2012

·     Recognized by St. Louis Business Journal as one of their Most Influential Diverse Leaders, 2007

·     Webster University Presidential citation for creative leadership in bringing top-flight business leaders and opinion makers to the campuses of Webster University's Success to Significance speaker series, 2007

·     Distinguished Alumni of the Year, Wayland Baptist University, 2008

·     The 100 top public and private board prospects - selected by a panel that includes senior managers from top executive search firms, former U.S. ambassadors, investor advocates, with the top 100 meeting the following criteria: demonstrated expertise in the far corners of the globe, legal and regulatory expertise, managing global divisions at public companies, and highly accomplished academics, Financial Times & Agenda International, 2011

·     The Clayton Chamber of Commerce Pillar of the Community Award, 2012

·     St. Louis Magazine Power List: The 100 People Who Are Shaping St. Louis, 2012

·     Ingram's Kansas City Business Magazine: 50 Missourians You Should Know, 2012

·     The Churchill Medal of Leadership, Westminster College, April 2017

Board engagements 
•   Board Member, Vi-Jon, the nation’s oldest private label manufacturer in the health and beauty sector, Oct. 2021–Present

•   Board Member, MUNY, the country’s largest outdoor musical theatre which produces seven world-class musicals each year with a mission is to enrich lives by producing exceptional musical theatre, accessible to all, while continuing its remarkable tradition in Forest Park.   Jan. 2019–Present

•   Board Member, Danforth Plant Science Center, the world’s largest independent nonprofit plant research institute, Aug. 2017–Present

•   Board Member, Executive Committee, Development Committee, Forest Park Forever, ranked as one of the nation's largest and most respected public parks, 2013–Present

•   Member, Board of Commissioners, Investment Committee, Saint Louis Art Museum, one of the principal U.S. art museums, with paintings, sculptures, cultural objects, and ancient masterpieces from all corners of the world, 2013–Present

•   Member, Advisory Board, FDC Fundação Dom Cabral, # 1 ranked business school in Brazil, 2011 – Present

•   Vice Chair of the Board, Argent Capital, an asset management company, 2013 – 2021

•   Legal Board Member, Regulatory & Compliance Committee, Enterprise Bank & Trust, April 2014 – June 2020

•   Board Member, The Saint Louis Club, the premier private-dining Club in the St. Louis region, enhancing both the professional and personal lives of members with rewarding experiences they can’t find anywhere else, 2013 – 2020

•   Member, Missouri Council for Better Economy, an organization charged with exploring unification of St. Louis City and St. Louis County as well as bolstering economic growth in Missouri, especially in the St. Louis region, 2013 - 2019

•   Chair, Education Steering Committee, Senior PGA Championship, Bellerive Country Club, 2013 – 2018

•   Board Member, RX Outreach, a nonprofit organization with the mission of providing affordable medication for the uninsured, 2010 - 2016

•   Advisory Board, The Vandiver Group, strategic communications firm offering strategic counsel, public relations, branding, market research, 2009 – 2015

•   Member, The Hungarian-Missouri Educational Partnership (HMEP), 2008 - 2015

•   Board of Advisors, Dean & Provost, academic publication focused on best practices and emerging issues confronted by academic Deans and Provosts, 2007 – 2015

•   Danced in the 2015 Dancing with the St. Louis Stars benefit fund raiser for the St. Louis Independence Center 

•   Vice-Chair, Board Member, Beyond Housing, non-profit organization and leading provider of housing and support services for low-income families and homeowners in St. Louis, MO, 2008 – May 2013

•   Director, Ralcorp Holdings (October 2010 – January 2013), publicly traded leading producer of private label and store brand foods and a major producer of food service products. In concert with the board, played an instrumental role in numerous strategic acquisitions made by Ralcorp and the spin-off of Post Cereals.

•   Member of the Board of Trustees and Past Chair, Investment Committee, Mary Institute Country Day School (MICDS). Independent, private, K-12 school, St. Louis, 2004 – 2011.

Personal life 
Benjamin is married to Bola Taiwo-Akande, also a native Nigerian, who he first met as a graduate student at the University of Oklahoma. They have three adult daughters.

References

External links

Living people
1962 births
American people of Yoruba descent
21st-century American economists
Nigerian emigrants to the United States
Wayland Baptist University alumni
Webster University faculty
People with acquired American citizenship
Westminster College (Missouri) faculty
Alumni of Saïd Business School
Harvard Kennedy School alumni
American academic administrators
Washington University in St. Louis faculty
Champlain College people
University of Oklahoma alumni
Heads of universities and colleges in the United States